The occupational name is from Slovenia the name means "fiddler musician".

It is also the 140,598th Most Common surname in the World, with approximately 3,174 individuals with this name.

Godec is a surname. Notable people with the surname include:

Alenka Godec (born 1964), Slovenian singer
Ančka Gošnik Godec (born 1927), Slovenian illustrator
Jelka Godec Schmidt (born 1958), Slovenian illustrator and writer
Jernej Godec (born 1986), Slovenian swimmer
Robert F. Godec (born 1956), American diplomat

Slovene-language surnames